Cadlinidae is a family of sea slugs, dorid nudibranchs, marine gastropod mollusks in the superfamily Doridoidea.

Molecular phylogenetic studies and their taxon-sampling schemes can have a strong influence of the resulting phylogeny. Research by R.F. Johnson in 2011 has shown that Cadlina does not belong to the family Chromodorididae. She has therefore brought back the name Cadlinidae from synonymy with Chromodorididae. She also included the genus Aldisa Bergh, 1878 in the family Cadlinidae.

Taxonomy 
Genera within the family Cadlinidae include:
 Aldisa Bergh, 1878
 Cadlina Bergh, 1878 - synonyms: Acanthochila Mörch, 1868; Echinochila Mörch, 1869; Inuda Er. Marcus & Ev. Marcus, 1967; Juanella Odhner, 1921

References

External links 

 
Gastropod families